Sekolah Menengah Kebangsaan Seri Hartamas (SMKSH) is a co-educational, public secondary school currently located at Sri Hartamas, a suburb of Kuala Lumpur, Malaysia.

Established in 1992, SMK Seri Hartamas was the first co-educational public secondary school in the Sri Hartamas area. The school was initially located at Taman Sri Hartamas before moving to its current location at Desa Sri Hartamas in 1999 (to accommodate the rising number of students and give way for the opening of Sekolah Kebangsaan Seri Hartamas). The school is renowned for its accomplishments in producing academically excellent students of exceptional upbringing and leadership.

History
SMK Seri Hartamas or usually known as SMKSH was established on December 1992 with 109 students, four classes and 13 teachers. During that time, the school building that should have been erected for the primary school in Taman Sri Hartamas was used. The first batch of students took the PMR exams in 1995 and the SPM in 1997. SMKSH moved to a new building (now) in Desa Sri Hartamas in November 1999. The number of SMKSH students up to October 31 for the 2006 study session was 1230 with the number of students per class being 35 and with 67 teachers. Today SMK Seri Hartamas continues to grow with 35 classes, more than 1300 students and 70 teaching staff.

Various efforts have been made in all areas to develop the school as an excellent school and to achieve its objectives. The school's excellence in the field of academics has proven that with each year SMK Seri Hartamas is in the top spot as the best daily school for PMR and SPM examinations.

SMK Seri Hartamas also won the Kuala Lumpur Federal Territory 3K state championship in 2004 and took third place in the national 3K competition in 2005.

Principals

The School Badge
The school badge consists of the words "S.M.K SERI HARTAMAS" on a banner in white against a background shield of Blue. Blue, represents the sense of togetherness. Whereas, Red, represents the message of love that should spread widely between the students and teachers in SMKSH.

The motto, Usaha Maju Jaya means "Efforts brings Success" in Malay.

School Song
This song was composed by Sim Meng Li with Janet Seevaratnam's Muzic.

Malay versionKami Warga SMK Seri HartamasBerjanji Mencapai Aspirasi MuMenuntut Ilmu Tidak JemuMengharumkan NamamuUsaha Maju Jaya Tekad KamiBersama Mencapai Hasrat MurniKami Berbangga DenganmuKami Menghargai JasamuBersatu Berdisiplin Bersemangat WajaMembangun Negara TercintaSMK Seri Hartamas Gemilang TerbilangSMK Seri Hartamas Gemilang Terbilang Bahasa Malaysia lyrics by Noormah Suid and Nooriza Mohd Nor

School Magazine
The school magazine of SMKSH is named the Titian Mas. It is published annually by the SMKSH Editorial Board since 1996. Titian Mas is a tribute to the victorious achievements of the multitude of students who have succeeded in lifting the school's name with dignity. This magazine presents a new motto for every volume. The latest motto for the 24th volume was Rising Up To The Challenge.

Student Boards
There are seven major boards in the school, namely the Prefectorial Board (Lembaga Pengawas), Board of Class Monitors (Lembaga Perwakilan Pelajar), Board of Student Librarians (Lembaga Pengawas Pusat Sumber), Board of Student Cooperation (Lembaga Pengawas Koperasi), Peers Board (Pembimbing Rakan Sebaya), SPBT Prefects Board (Lembaga Pengawas SPBT) and the Editorial Board (Sidang Ridaksi). All of these boards conduct an annual dinner for the advisor teachers and the board crew every year.

Prefectorial Board
The Board of Prefects consists of two divisions, the Discipline and the General Management Division (RPA). The Discipline Division is to ensure that student discipline is maintained and that school rules are upheld. The RPA Division is responsible for collecting the students' EDU program (Program DIDIK) scores each month. The Board of Prefects also contributes significantly to the school events. This board goes by a motto which is 'Lead with Initiative, Serve with Love'

Interviews for appointments as prefects are extended only to selected students after the examination. The interviewing panel consist of the members of the Executive Committee. Successful interviewees would undergo a period of probation where the duration is determined by the Executive Committee of the Board and the Advisor(s). They will then participate in Prefects camp.

Inauguration of the in-coming elected Executive Committee and the installation of new Senior Prefects are held annually in a ceremony. Upon installation, the new Senior Prefects will wear a navy blue blazer, along with the standard school badge and a navy blue nametag bearing their name and position in the board.

Board of Class Monitors
The Board of Class Monitors is set up to provide exposure and experience for students to become future leaders and to help the school students' discipline issues in the classroom. The board also acts as a channel for students to present their problems to grade teachers.
This board was established to assist teachers with daily tasks such as taking attendance and maintaining the order in class. Members of this Board do not wear special uniforms but a red tie and a small tag written with "Ketua Tingkatan" and "Penolong Ketua Tingkatan" will be given to the members and are required to wear with school uniforms at all times.

Board of Student Librarians
The Board of Student Librarians' uniform is usually long-sleeved yellow shirt, brown tie, blazer and pants for the boys or brown skirt for the girls. The Librarians wear a Librarian's Badge, with a yellow tag bearing the word "Librarian". A Librarian's name tag is worn immediately above the School's Badge. The Executive Committee members of the Board of Student Librarians retains their Board Badge and wears a separate tag bearing their respective portfolio titles.

Board of Student Cooperation
The uniform of this Board is black slacks (for boys) or black skirt (for girls) with white colour sleeve shirts together with a black tie. The Board of Student Cooperation was established to help in managing students locker and promoting school supplies such as school tie and badges.

Peers Board
The PRS uniform is purple shirt or purple vest with black pants (for boys) or black skirts (for girls). They're given a golden nametag.

SPBT Prefects Board
The Board of Student SPBT Prefects was established to coordinate the loaning, returning and preservation of textbooks. Apart from the annual loaning and returning of textbooks at the end of every academic year, they are responsible for making sure the textbooks are treated with care and respect throughout the loan period. The prefects are trained to wrap books neatly (i.e. wrapping the covers tightly with minimal excess plastic wrapping) and cataloguing textbooks. The prefects wear green colour uniform with a green badge.

Editorial Board
Members of this Board wear a black polo shirt with the board's name at the back of the shirt, school emblem in the front on the left side and their name on the right sleeve. The Editorial crew consists of Form 3, 4 and 5 students. Students usually have to undergo an interview with the head teacher advisor and the Exceliors. Membership from students in existing Boards are allowed as long as their prior responsibilities do not impede the progress of the magazine production. The Excelsior's Editor-in-Chief is assisted by his/her sub-editors and six other departments, namely Marketing, Advertising, Features, Graphics, Photography, and Academic & Co-curriculum. Every member is selected based on their strengths (e.g. writing, photography, etc.) and ability to work in a team. The teacher advisor and the team are given privileged access to all events related to the school to be able to capture important moments in photos and words for the Excelsior. The Board's duties requires precision in their works to be able to meet tight deadlines. This board plays an important role of making and editing the school magazine.

House System

In 2020, Amethyst House was removed from the SMKSH house system, leaving only four houses representing the school.

See also
 List of schools in Kuala Lumpur

References

External links
 

Secondary schools in Kuala Lumpur
Educational institutions established in 1992
1992 establishments in Malaysia